This is the discography of Chinese singer, Zhang Liyin consists one studio album, nine singles and four soundtrack appearances.

Zhang originally debuted in South Korea through SM Entertainment with debut single "Timeless", release in September 2006 and the chinese version of "Timeless" were released in 2007 in Taiwan.
Zhang officially entered the chinese music scene in 2008 with release her first studio album I Will. In 2009, her second single "Moving On" were released. In 2014, Zhang released two single: "Agape" and "Not Alone" after five years.

Studio albums

Singles

Soundtrack appearances

Other releases

Music videos

References

External links 
  Zhang Liyin's Official Site
  SM Entertainment's Official Site
  Zhang Liyin's Avex Site

Discographies of Chinese artists
Pop music discographies
Rhythm and blues discographies
Discographies of South Korean artists